City FC or just City often refers to:

 Manchester City F.C.
 Melbourne City FC
 New York City FC

City FC may also refer to:

Association football/soccer

Australia 

 A-League

 Melbourne City FC
 Melbourne City FC NPL
 Melbourne City FC (W-League)
 Melbourne City FC Youth

 National Premier Leagues

 Adelaide City FC
 Blacktown City FC
 Brisbane City FC
 Charlestown City Blues FC
 Devonport City FC
 Lake Macquarie City FC
 Launceston City FC
 Hakoah Sydney City East FC
 Hume City FC
 Northcote City FC
 Rockdale City Suns FC

 Other clubs

 Bankstown City FC
 Bendigo City FC
 Canberra City FC
 Enfield City FC
 Fremantle City FC
 Gosnells City FC
 Hurstville City Minotaurs FC
 Ipswich City FC
 Kingston City FC
 Knox City FC
 Mandurah City FC
 Malvern City FC
 Moreland City FC
 Nunawading City FC
 Queanbeyan City FC
 Rockingham City FC
 Werribee City FC
 White City FC

Ireland 

 Cork City F.C.
 Dublin City F.C.

New Zealand 

 Napier City Rovers FC
 Papakura City FC
 Waitakere City F.C.

South Korea 

 Cheonan City FC
 Gangneung City FC
 Mokpo City FC
 Suwon City FC
 Yongin City FC

United Kingdom

England 

 Premier League

 Leicester City F.C.
 Manchester City F.C.

 Football League Championship

 Birmingham City F.C.
 Bristol City F.C.
 Coventry City F.C.
 Norwich City F.C.
 Stoke City F.C.

 Football League One

 Hull City A.F.C.
 Lincoln City F.C.

 Football League Two

 Bradford City A.F.C.
 Exeter City F.C.
 Salford City F.C.

 National League

 Bath City F.C.
 Chelmsford City F.C.
 Gloucester City A.F.C.
 Oxford City F.C.
 St Albans City F.C.
 York City F.C.

 Other men's clubs

 Cambridge City F.C.
 Ely City F.C.
 Truro City F.C.
 Wells City F.C.
 Winchester City F.C.
 Worcester City F.C.

 Women's clubs

 Birmingham City L.F.C.
 Bristol City W.F.C.
 Leicester City W.F.C.
 London City Lionesses
 Manchester City W.F.C.
 Stoke City F.C. (Women)

Northern Ireland 

 Armagh City F.C.
 Derry City F.C.

Scotland 

 Brechin City F.C.
 Edinburgh City F.C.
 Elgin City F.C.

Wales 

 Cardiff City F.C.
 Cardiff City FC (women)
 Swansea City A.F.C.
 Swansea City Ladies F.C.

United States 

 Major League Soccer

 New York City FC
 New York City FC Academy

 United Soccer League

 Louisville City FC
 Oklahoma City FC (NPSL)

 Premier Development League

 FC Miami City
 San Francisco City FC

 National Premier Soccer League

 Buffalo City FC
 Charm City FC
 Dallas City FC
 Detroit City FC
 Gate City FC
 Memphis City FC
 Pensacola City FC
 Queen City FC
 Virginia Beach City FC

Other countries 

 Americas

 Capital City F.C. (Canada)
 Montevideo City Torque (Uruguay)

 Asia
 Shenzhen City FC (China)
 Chennai City FC (India)
 Mumbai City FC (India)

 FC Pune City (India)
 Tokyo Musashino City FC (Japan)

 Africa

 Awassa City F.C. (Ethiopia)
 Cape Town City F.C. (NFL) (South Africa, 1962-1977)
 Cape Town City F.C. (2016) (South Africa, from 2016)
 Polokwane City F.C. (South Africa)
 Midas Mbabane City F.C. (Swaziland)

 Europe

 Almere City FC (Netherlands)
 Oslo City FC (Norway)
 Malmö City FC (Sweden)

Other sports 

 Melbourne City Football Club (1912–13), an Australian rules football club.